Luigi Agricola (c. 1750 – 1821 or after) was an Italian painter active in Rome.

He also worked with jewelry. He painted a St. Michael the Archangel for the Academy of St Luke in Rome, where he was a professor. He painted an altarpiece of St Elizabeth, Queen of Portugal for the church of Sant'Antonio dei Portoghesi. Another painter by the same name (1667-1712), originally from Ratisbon, was active in landscape painting in the mid-17th century, settling down in Venice.

References

18th-century Italian people
19th-century Italian people
Painters from Rome
18th-century Italian painters
Italian male painters
19th-century Italian painters
Italian neoclassical painters
1750s births
Year of birth uncertain
Year of death uncertain
19th-century Italian male artists
18th-century Italian male artists